is a 4-panel manga series created by Rui Tamachi revolving around anthropomorphised cockroaches. The manga originally existed as self-published doujin works, first released at Comiket in 2009, before beginning serialization in Houbunsha's Manga Time Kirara Carat magazine from March 2011 to August 2016. An anime adaptation by Movic began releasing on Nico Nico Douga in 2012.

Characters

An anthropomorphised cockroach girl who wishes to become friends with humans, but is often treated with the appropriate response.

Another cockroach girl who is a bit more tomboyish in personality.

A girl working a part time job who appears in the Houbunsha serialization.

A boy who is the Part Time Girl's underclassman.

 The cute cat that plays with Gokicha.

Media

Manga
Gokicha originally existed as a doujin work self-published by Rui Tamachi. The first volume, Gokicha!!, was released at Comiket 77 in December 2009, while the second volume, Gokicha!!!, was released at Comiket 78 in August 2010. The manga then began serialization in the September 2011 issue of Houbunsha's Manga Time Kirara Carat magazine released on July 28, 2011. The first tankoubon volume was released on July 26, 2012, the fourth on August 27, 2015. The fifth and final volume was released on August 10, 2016.

Anime
An anime adaptation titled Gokicha!! Cockroach Girls has been produced by Movic and began streaming on Nico Nico Douga from September 14, 2012.

References

External links
Gokicha!! anime on Nico Nico Douga 

Manga series
2009 manga
2012 anime ONAs
Anime series
Comedy anime and manga
Fictional cockroaches
Houbunsha manga
Seinen manga
Yonkoma